Playhouse Disney was a brand of programming blocks and international cable and satellite television channels that were owned by the Disney Channels Worldwide unit (now Disney Branded Television) of The Walt Disney Company's Disney–ABC Television Group. It originated in the United States as a morning program block on the Disney Channel. Aimed mainly at children aged 2 to 7 years old, its programming featured a mix of live-action and animated series.

The Playhouse Disney block on Disney Channel was rebranded as the Disney Junior block on Disney Channel on February 14, 2011. The remaining channels and blocks using the Playhouse Disney brand outside the US relaunched under the Disney Junior brand over the next two years, concluding with the rebranding of the Playhouse Disney block on Disney Channel Russia on September 1, 2013.

History

Early years (1997–2002)
Prior to Playhouse Disney's launch, Disney Channel had aired a lineup of preschool-targeted programs to compete with Nick Jr. (which were mixed alongside animated series aimed at older children) during the morning hours since its debut in April 1983.

On April 6, 1997, Disney Channel underwent a relaunch that signified the beginning of its full conversion into a commercial-free basic cable channel, and its preschool block now utilized a similar graphics package for its promotions as that used for the channel's afternoon children's programs. After Disney Channel's preschool block premiered three new original series in 1998 (PB&J Otter, Rolie Polie Olie (produced by Canadian animation studio Nelvana), and the live-action series Out of the Box), the block rebranded as Playhouse Disney on February 1, 1999.

One of the Playhouse Disney block's most popular series was Bear in the Big Blue House, an educational puppetry series from Jim Henson Television that debuted on October 20, 1997, focusing on the adventures of Bear (performed by Noel MacNeal); the series was named by TV Guide as one of the "top 10 new shows for kids" that year. For the first three years of its run, the Playhouse Disney block originally aired each weekday from 8:30 a.m. to 2:30 p.m. Eastern Time, and weekends from 6:00 to 10:00 a.m. Eastern Time. Following each program, which usually ran 23 minutes (most of which, with the exception of films, aired without promotional interruption), the remainder of the time period was filled by either short segments and music videos (the latter of which were originally aired under the banner "Feet Beat") or an episode of an acquired short series.

On April 16, 2001, Playhouse Disney introduced a new on-air graphics package produced by motion graphics company Beehive; actress Allyce Beasley began serving as the U.S. block's promo announcer at this time, a capacity she would hold until March 30, 2007. Radio Disney cross-promoted the block by rebranding its "Mickey and Minnie's Tune Time" block as "Playhouse Disney", and in 2002, the TV block's "Feet Beat" interstitials were renamed "BB's Music Time" to promote the Radio Disney block. On June 25, 2001, Disney-ABC Cable Networks Group (now Disney-ABC Television Group) announced plans to launch Playhouse Disney Channel, a companion digital cable and satellite channel that would have served the same target audience as the Disney Channel block; plans for the network were later scrapped, although Disney-ABC International Television would launch dedicated Playhouse Disney channels and blocks in international markets (including Canada, Afro-Eurasia and Latin America) between 2002 and 2007. The Walt Disney Company acquired the broadcast rights to The Wiggles as part of their purchase of the Fox Family Channel in 2001; The Wiggles moved to Playhouse Disney in June 2002 and became one of the block's most watched shows during its run.

Marketing expansion (2002–2011)
Like Disney Channel, Playhouse Disney was a commercial-free service, but it did show short "promotional spots" (structured as short-form segments for Disney products targeted at the block's demographics) alongside – beginning in 2002 – underwriter sponsorships (with companies such as McDonald's) within breaks between programs (preschool-targeted programs that aired between 3:00 and 7:00 a.m. Central Time outside of the Playhouse Disney banner, included the promotional shorts for Disney entertainment products that were seen during Disney Channel's afternoon and nighttime schedule). On September 30, 2002, Playhouse Disney changed its logo to reflect Disney Channel's on-air rebranding. As part of the block's effort to phase out its older interstitial material, it introduced a mascot that month named Clay (voiced by Debi Derryberry), an anthropomorphic clay figure who often used the catchphrases "It's true!" and "Are you with me?".

On March 31, 2007, Ooh and Aah, two puppet monkeys (who served as the main characters for one of the short series featured on the Playhouse Disney lineup, Ooh, Aah & You) became the official hosts of the block, replacing Clay. Every summer since 2007, Playhouse Disney's end time was truncated to four hours on weekdays (from 6:00 to 10:00 a.m. Eastern Time). Episodes from Disney Channel's original series were aired during the late morning and early afternoon hours. However, the weekend schedule continued to air for seven hours. By this point, the Playhouse Disney block had expanded to air from 4:00 a.m. to 2:00 p.m. Eastern Time on weekdays, and 4:00 to 9:00 a.m. Eastern Time on weekends, each running a different schedule.

Rebranding as Disney Junior

On May 26, 2010, Disney-ABC Television Group announced the launch of Disney Junior, a relaunching of Playhouse Disney that would serve as the brand for the Disney Channel block and a new standalone digital cable and satellite channel in the United States, as well as the new brand for the existing Playhouse Disney-branded cable channels and program blocks outside the US. The Playhouse Disney block ended its 14-year run on February 13, 2011, with the last program to air being an episode of the short series Handy Manny's School for Tools at 8:55 a.m. Eastern Time.

The Disney Junior block debuted on February 14, 2011, with the Little Einsteins episode “Fire Truck Rocket” as its first program. Several former Playhouse Disney series were carried over to the relaunched block including Mickey Mouse Clubhouse, Special Agent Oso, Imagination Movers, Handy Manny, and Little Einsteins. With the relaunch of the block, the block's mascots Ooh and Aah were retired and several of its older programs were entirely discontinued (however, Ooh and Aah & You was later briefly available on the Disney Junior website as a part of the Fan Favorites week of July 18, 2011 and was also later carried in reruns on the Disney Junior cable channel). Additionally, its episodes are available on Disney Junior's YouTube channel as of January 6, 2011.

The 24-hour Disney Junior cable channel debuted on March 23, 2012, with the Mickey Mouse Clubhouse episode "Mickey's Big Surprise" as its first program, mainly featuring a mix of original series and programs held over from the Playhouse Disney library (which largely aired as part of the channel's overnight schedule until mid-2014 when overtime, more Playhouse Disney shows were taken off the air completely after premiering it's series finales and ceasing to air in reruns). Disney Junior took over the channel space held by the Disney-owned soap opera-focused channel Soapnet, largely due to that channel's existing subscriber reach (being carried in 75 million households with pay television). An automated Soapnet feed remained in operation for providers that did not yet reach agreements to carry the Disney Junior channel or providers that were required to continue carrying Soapnet in addition to Disney Junior until Soapnet fully ceased operations by going quietly dark on December 31, 2013, at 11:59 pm, following the last program to air being an episode of General Hospital.

Programming

International
On September 28, 1999, the Playhouse Disney brand was extended internationally with the launch of a self-branded block on Disney Channel in the United Kingdom and Ireland. On September 29, 2000, Disney Television International expanded the block with the launch of a channel in the country alongside the launch of Toon Disney and Disney Channel +1 on the Sky Digital platform. On April 4, 2009, Egmont Group launched a companion Playhouse Disney magazine in the United Kingdom & Republic of Ireland that focused on the channel's four most popular shows: Mickey Mouse Clubhouse, My Friends Tigger & Pooh, Handy Manny and Little Einsteins. Each issue included "to do" pages and suggested activities for parents and children based on an educational theme. The Playhouse Disney block on Disney Channel UK & Republic of Ireland was eventually disposed of in July 2004 after reducing hours of programming. The Playhouse Disney channel available there, however, continued to air until it was replaced by Disney Junior on May 7, 2011.

On November 30, 2007, Astral Media launched a Canadian version of Playhouse Disney Channel under a brand licensing agreement with Disney-ABC Television Group; the channel operated as a multiplex channel of Family Channel, which had long maintained a programming distribution agreement with Disney Channel for the domestic rights to the U.S. channel's series until January 2016. A Canadian-French version of Playhouse Disney was launched on July 5, 2010, also by Astral Media. The English & Canadian-French channels were both replaced by Disney Junior on May 6, 2011.

List of international channels and blocks

See also
 Nick Jr. – a preschool-targeted digital cable and satellite network that originated as a program block on Nickelodeon from 1988 to 2009 and a channel since 2009
Sprout (TV channel) – a defunct preschool-targeted digital cable and satellite network. It has since rebranded as a youth audience channel, Universal Kids, as of 2017. 
 Disney Junior – the successor, a channel that is based on Playhouse Disney and has been airing since 2011 as a television block on Disney Channel and a channel since 2012

References

External links
  (Archive)

Disney Channel
Disney Junior
Children's television networks in the United States
Commercial-free television networks
Disney Junior original programming
Disney television networks
Television programming blocks in the United States
Television channels and stations established in 1997
Television channels and stations disestablished in 2011
Preschool education television networks